The Arvicolinae are a subfamily of rodents that includes the voles, lemmings, and muskrats.  They are most closely related to the other subfamilies in the Cricetidae (comprising the hamsters and New World rats and mice).  Some authorities place the subfamily Arvicolinae in the family Muridae along with all other members of the superfamily Muroidea.  Some refer to the subfamily as the Microtinae (yielding the adjective "microtine") or rank the taxon as a full family, the Arvicolidae.

The Arvicolinae are the most populous group of Rodentia in the Northern Hemisphere.  They often are found in fossil occlusions of bones cached by past predators such as owls and other birds of prey.  Fossils of this group are often used for biostratigraphic dating of paleontological and archeological sites in North America and Europe.

Description 
The most convenient distinguishing feature of the Arvicolinae is the nature of their molar teeth, which have prismatic cusps in the shape of alternating triangles.  These molars are an adaptation to a herbivorous diet in which the major food plants include a large proportion of abrasive materials such as phytoliths; the teeth get worn down by abrasion throughout the adult life of the animal and they grow continuously in compensation.

Arvicolinae are Holarctic in distribution and represent one of only a few major muroid radiations to reach the New World via Beringia.  (The others are the three subfamilies of New World rats and mice.)  Arvicolines do very well in the subnival zone beneath the winter snowpack, and persist throughout winter without needing to hibernate.  They are also characterized by extreme fluctuations in population numbers.

Most arvicolines are small, furry, short-tailed voles or lemmings, but some, such as Ellobius and Hyperacrius, are well adapted to a fossorial lifestyle.  Others, such as Ondatra, Neofiber,  and Arvicola, have evolved larger body sizes and are associated with an aquatic lifestyle.

Phylogeny 
The phylogeny of the Arvicolinae has been studied using morphological and molecular characters. Markers for the molecular phylogeny of arvicolines included the mitochondrial DNA cytochrome b (cyb) gene 
and the exon 10 of the growth hormone receptor (ghr) nuclear gene. The comparison of the cyb and ghr phylogenetic results seems to indicate nuclear genes are useful for resolving relationships of recently evolved animals. As compared to mitochondrial genes, nuclear genes display several informative sites in third codon positions that evolve rapidly enough to accumulate synapomorphies, but slow enough to avoid evolutionary noise.
Of note, mitochondrial pseudogenes translocated within the nuclear genome complicate the assessment of the mitochondrial DNA orthology, but they can also be used as phylogenetic markers.
Sequencing complete mitochondrial genomes of voles  may help to distinguish between authentic genes and pseudogenes.

The complementary phylogenetic analysis of morphological and molecular characters 
suggests:
 Ellobius, Prometheomys, and Lagurus are among the most basal arvicolines.
 Dicrostonyx, Phenacomys, and Arborimus may form a clade.
 Core arvicolines include three subclades:
 Lemmini: Synaptomys, Lemmus, Myopus
 Clethrionomyini: Eothenomys, Myodes
 Arvicolini: Arvicola, Chionomys, Stenocranius, and Microtus
 Microtus sensu lato contains Alexandromys, ‘Neodon’, Mynomes, Lasiopodomys, Terricola, and Microtus sensu stricto.
 Ondatra and Dinaromys positions are uncertain, probably compromised by the convergent evolution of morphological characters.

Some authorities have placed the zokors within the Arvicolinae, but they have been shown  to be unrelated.

A 2021 study found Lemmini to be the most basal group of Arvicolinae. The study also found Arvicola to actually fall outside the tribe Arvicolini, and to be sister to the tribe Lagurini.

Classification 

Subfamily Arvicolinae - voles, lemmings, muskrats

The subfamily Arvicolinae contains eleven tribes, eight of which are classified as voles, two as lemmings, and one as muskrats.

 Tribe Arvicolini
 Genus Arvicola - water voles
 European (or Northern) water vole, A. amphibius (A. terrestris)
 Southwestern (or southern) water vole, A. sapidus
 Montane water vole, A. scherman
 Genus Chionomys - snow voles
 Caucasian snow vole, C. gud
 European snow vole, C. nivalis
 Robert's snow vole, C. roberti
 Genus Lasiopodomys
 Brandt's vole, L. brandtii
 Plateau vole, L. fuscus
 Mandarin vole, L. mandarinus
 Genus Lemmiscus
 Sagebrush vole, L. curtatus
 Genus Microtus - voles
 Insular vole, M. abbreviatus
 California vole, M. californicus
 Rock vole, M. chrotorrhinus
 Long-tailed vole, M. longicaudus
 Mexican vole, M. mexicanus
 Singing vole, M. miurus
 North American water vole, M.  richardsoni
 Zempoaltépec vole, M. umbrosus
 Taiga vole, M. xanthognathus
 Subgenus Microtus
 Field vole, M. agrestis
 Anatolian vole, M. anatolicus
 Common vole, M. arvalis
 Cabrera's vole, M. cabrerae
 Doğramaci's vole, M. dogramacii
Elbeyli vole, M. elbeyli
 Günther's vole, M. guentheri
 Harting's vole, M. hartingii
Tien Shan vole, M. ilaeus
 Persian vole, M. irani
Mediterranean field vole, M. lavernedii
Turkish vole, M. lydius
Kerman vole, M. kermanensis
 Southern vole, M. levis
 Paradox vole, M. paradoxus
 Qazvin vole, M. qazvinensis
 Portuguese field vole, M. rosianus
Schidlovsky's vole, M. schidlovskii
 Social vole, M. socialis
 European pine vole, M. subterraneus
 Transcaspian vole, M. transcaspicus
 Subgenus Blanfordimys
 Afghan vole, M. afghanus
 Bucharian vole, M. bucharicus
Juniper vole, M. juldaschi
Subgenus Terricola
 Bavarian pine vole, M. bavaricus
 Calabria pine vole, M. brachycercus
 Daghestan pine vole, M. daghestanicus
 Mediterranean pine vole, M. duodecimcostatus
 Felten's vole, M. felteni
 Liechtenstein's pine vole, M. liechtensteini
 Lusitanian pine vole, M. lusitanicus
 Major's pine vole, M. majori
 Alpine pine vole, M. multiplex
Sicilian pine vole, M. nebrodensis
 Savi's pine vole, M. savii
 Tatra pine vole, M. tatricus
 Thomas's pine vole, M. thomasi
 Subgenus Mynomes
 Gray-tailed vole, M. canicaudus
Western meadow vole, M. drummondi
Florida salt marsh vole, M. dukecampbelli
 Montane vole, M.  montanus
 Creeping vole, M. oregoni
 Eastern meadow vole, M. pennsylvanicus
 Townsend's vole, M. townsendii
 Subgenus Alexandromys
 Clarke's vole, M.  clarkei
 Evorsk vole, M. evoronensis
 Reed vole, M. fortis
 Gerbe's vole, M. gerbei
 Taiwan vole, M. kikuchii
 Lacustrine vole, M. limnophilus
 Maximowicz's vole, M.  maximowiczii
 Middendorf's vole, M. middendorffi
 Mongolian vole, M. mongolicus
 Japanese grass vole, M. montebelli
 Muisk vole, Microtus mujanensis
 Tundra vole (root vole), M. oeconomus
 Sakhalin vole, M. sachalinensis
 Subgenus Stenocranius
 Narrow-headed vole, M. gregalis
 Subgenus Pitymys
 Guatemalan vole, M. guatemalensis
 Tarabundí vole, M. oaxacensis
 Woodland vole, M. pinetorum
 Jalapan pine vole, M. quasiater
 Subgenus Pedomys
 Prairie vole, M. ochrogaster
 Subgenus Hyrcanicola
 Schelkovnikov's pine vole, M. schelkovnikovi
 Genus Neodon - mountain voles
 Chinese scrub vole, N.  irene
 Sikkim mountain vole, N. sikimensis
 Forrest's mountain vole, N. forresti
 Linzhi mountain vole, N. linzhiensis
 Genus Phaiomys
 Blyth's vole, P. leucurus
 Genus Proedromys
 Duke of Bedford's vole, P. bedfordi
Liangshan vole, P. liangshanensis
 Genus Volemys
 Szechuan vole, V. millicens
 Marie's vole, V. musseri
 Tribe Dicrostonychini - collared lemmings
 Genus Dicrostonyx
 Northern collared lemming, D. groenlandicus
 Nelson's collared lemming,  D. nelsoni
 Ungava collared lemming, D.  hudsonius
 Ogilvie Mountains collared lemming, D. nunatakensis
 Richardson's collared lemming, D. richardsoni
 Arctic lemming, D. torquatus
 Unalaska collared lemming, D. unalascensis
 Tribe Ellobiusini - mole voles
 Genus Ellobius - mole voles
 Alai mole vole, E. alaicus
 Southern mole vole, E. fuscocapillus
 Transcaucasian mole vole, E. lutescens
 Northern mole vole, E. talpinus
 Zaisan mole vole, E. tancrei
 Tribe Lagurini
 Genus Eolagurus
 Yellow steppe lemming, E. luteus
 Przewalski's steppe lemming, E.  przewalskii
 Genus Lagurus
 Steppe lemming, L. lagurus
 Tribe Lemmini 
 Genus Lemmus - true lemmings
 Amur lemming, L. amurensis
 Norway lemming, L. lemmus
 Beringian lemming, L. nigripes
 East Siberian lemming, L. paulus
 West Siberian lemming, L. sibiricus
 Canadian lemming, L. trimucronatus
 Genus Myopus
 Wood lemming, M. schisticolor
 Genus Synaptomys - bog lemmings
 Northern bog lemming, S. borealis
 Southern bog lemming, S. cooperi
 Tribe Myodini
 Genus Alticola - voles from Central Asia
 Subgenus Alticola
 White-tailed mountain vole, A. albicauda
 Silver mountain vole, A. argentatus
 Gobi Altai mountain vole, A. barakshin
 Central Kashmir vole, A. montosa
 Royle's mountain vole, A. roylei
 Mongolian silver vole, A. semicanus
 Stolička's mountain vole, A. stoliczkanus
 Tuva silver vole, A. tuvinicus
 Subgenus Aschizomys
 Lemming vole, A. lemminus
 Large-eared vole, A. macrotis
 Lake Baikal mountain vole, A. olchonensis
 Subgenus Platycranius
 Flat-headed vole, A. strelzowi
 Genus Caryomys
 Ganzu vole, C. eva
 Kolan vole, C. inez
 Genus Eothenomys - voles from East Asia
 Kachin red-backed vole, E. cachinus
 Pratt's vole, E. chinensis
 Southwest China vole, E. custos
 Père David's vole, E. melanogaster
 Yunnan red-backed vole, E. miletus
 Chaotung vole, E. olitor
 Yulungshan vole, E. proditor
 Ward's red-backed vole, E. wardi
 Genus Hyperacrius - voles from Pakistan
 True's vole, H. fertilis
 Murree vole, H. wynnei
 Genus Myodes - red-backed voles
 Anderson's red-backed vole, M. andersoni
 Western red-backed vole, M. californicus
 Tien Shan red-backed vole, M. centralis
 Southern red-backed vole, M. gapperi
 Bank vole, M. glareolus
 Imaizumi's red-backed vole, M. imaizumii
 Korean red-backed vole, M. regulus
 Hokkaido red-backed vole, M. rex
 Grey red-backed vole, M. rufocanus
 Northern red-backed vole, M. rutilus
 Shansei vole, M. shanseius
 Smith's vole, M. smithii
 Tribe Ondatrini - muskrats
 Genus Neofiber
 Round-tailed muskrat, N. alleni
Genus Ondatra
 Muskrat, O. zibethicus
 Tribe Phenacomyini
Genus Arborimus - tree voles
 White-footed vole, A. albipes
 Red tree vole, A. longicaudus
 Sonoma tree vole or California red tree mouse, A. pomo
 Genus Phenacomys - heather voles
 Western heather vole, P. intermedius
 Eastern heather vole, P. ungava
Tribe Pliomyini
 Genus Dinaromys
 Balkan snow vole, D. bogdanovi
 Tribe Prometheomyini
 Genus Prometheomys
 Long-clawed mole vole, P. schaposchnikowi

Fossil species 
 Tribe Arvicolini
 Genus Mimomys †
 Tribe Dicrostonychini - collared lemmings
 Genus Predicrostonyx †
 Hopkins's lemming, Predicrostonyx hopkinsi †
 Tribe Clethrionomyini
 Genus Altaiomys †
 Genus Pitymimomys †
 Genus Borsodia †
 Genus Allophaiomys †
 Genus Prolagurus †

See also 

 Hantavirus
 Isla Vista virus

References

External links 

 
Mammal subfamilies
Taxa named by John Edward Gray